is a 2017 comedy movie from Japan, directed by Tsutomu Hanabusa. The film featured at the 2017 Melbourne Japanese Film Festival. It is based on the novel "Tori Girl" by Kō Nakamura (published 2012 by KADOKAWA MAGAZINES).

Plot 
Yukina (Tao Tsuchiya) has always been an easygoing type. However, she ends up through no fault of her own, in a second rate University. She meets Kei (Mahiro Takasugi), who recruits her into a very nerdy club focused on achieving human-powered flight. While initially being half-hearted about the attempt, she quickly gets involved in the drama of the event, and competes for the top position of pilot of the aircraft, competing at a birdman rally at Lake Biwa.

Cast
Tao Tsuchiya as Yukina Toriyama
Shotaro Mamiya as Taishi Sakaba
Mahiro Takasugi as Kei Takahashi
Elaiza Ikeda as Kazumi Shimamura
Yūma Yamoto
Shinichi Hatori

References

External links

2017 films
2010s Japanese films
Japanese drama films
Kadokawa Dwango franchises
Films directed by Tsutomu Hanabusa
Films set in universities and colleges
Films based on Japanese novels
Human-powered aircraft
2017 drama films